Yaya Banhoro (born 1 January 1996), known simply as Yaya in Brazil, is a Burkinabé footballer who plays as a forward for the Burkina Faso national football team.

Club career

Londrina
Born in Ouagadougou, Yaya started playing for local side Majestic FC before moving to Brazil with Londrina in 2015.

On 6 March 2016 Yaya made his debut for Londrina, coming on as a second-half substitute for Paulinho Moccelin in a 1–1 Campeonato Paranaense home draw against Atlético Paranaense. On 8 August, after only two further appearances, he was loaned to Iraty until the end of the year.

Yaya scored four goals during his loan spell, and started to feature regularly for Londrina upon returning. He scored his first goal for the club on 16 April 2017, netting his team's only in a 2–1 away loss Atlético Paranaense.

Santos
On 1 November 2017, after a trial period, Yaya signed for Santos until April 2018, and was initially assigned to the B-team. On 15 January 2019, after a failed trial at Ponte Preta the previous year, he was loaned to Bangu until the end of the 2019 Campeonato Carioca.

International career
Yaya was first called up for Burkina Faso national football team in May 2017. He made his full international debut on 2 September 2017, replacing Cyrille Bayala in a 0–0 away draw against Senegal.

Career statistics

Club

International

References

External links
 

1996 births
Living people
People from Ouagadougou
Burkinabé footballers
Association football forwards
Londrina Esporte Clube players
Iraty Sport Club players
Santos FC players
Bangu Atlético Clube players
Joinville Esporte Clube players
Burkina Faso international footballers
Burkinabé expatriate footballers
Expatriate footballers in Brazil
21st-century Burkinabé people